Zieria southwellii is a plant in the citrus family Rutaceae and is endemic to eastern Australia. It is a large shrub or small tree with its leaves composed of three leaflets, and has groups of large numbers of flowers with four white petals, the groups shorter than the leaves. It grows near rainforest in northern New South Wales and far south-eastern Queensland.

Description
The flowers are arranged in large numbers in upper leaf axils, the groups usually shorter than the leaves. In common with other zierias, there are only four stamens. Flowering occurs from August to December and is followed by fruits which are mostly glabrous capsules dotted with oil glands.

Taxonomy and naming
Zieria southwellii was first formally described in 2002 by James Armstrong and the description was published in Australian Systematic Botany.

Distribution and habitat
This zieria is found in the Lamington National Park and the Springbrook area in Queensland and in as far south as the Dorrigo Plateau in New South Wales. It grows near rainforests and in adjacent wet sclerophyll forest.

References

southwellii
Flora of New South Wales
Flora of Queensland
Sapindales of Australia
Plants described in 2002